Hugo Alain Fauroux (born 23 August 1996) is a French professional footballer who currently plays for USL Championship side Loudoun United.

Career

Youth
Fauroux spent time in the academies of Cannes and Monaco.

College & Amateur
In 2015, Fauroux moved to the United States to play college soccer at Lake Erie College. He went on to make 24 appearances for the Storm and was named GLIAC Goalkeeper of the Year in 2016. In 2017, Fauroux transferred to Florida International University, making 29 appearances them over two seasons, been named All-Conference USA Third-Team in his junior season.

In 2018, Fauroux also appeared for USL Premier Development League side FC Miami City.

Valdres FK
Ahead of their 2019 season, Norwegian 3. divisjon side Valdres FK announced the signing of Fauroux. He made 8 appearances the club during a season where they finished bottom of the league with only 3 points and a goal difference of -183 over 26 games.

Palm Beach Stars
In 2020, Fauroux returned to the United States, joining UPSL side Palm Beach Stars.

Austin Bold
On 10 March 2021, Fauroux signed with USL Championship side Austin Bold. He made his debut for Austin on 15 May 2021, starting in a 3–1 loss to New Mexico United.

Charleston Battery
On 1 March 2022, Fauroux signed with USL Championship club Charleston Battery ahead of their 2022 season. He made his club debut during the Lamar Hunt U.S. Open Cup on 7 April 2022, starting against South Georgia Tormenta FC in the Second Round. Fauroux became a regular starter for the Battery midway through the 2022 season and would register the seventh-most saves in the league's regular season with 83. Following the 2022 season, Fauroux was released by Charleston.

Loudoun United
On 3 February 2023, Faroux signed with USL Championship side Loudoun United for their 2023 season.

References

External links
 Lake Erie College bio
 FIU bio
 Austin Bold bio

1996 births
Norwegian Third Division players
AS Cannes players
AS Monaco FC players
Association football goalkeepers
Austin Bold FC players
Charleston Battery players
Expatriate footballers in Norway
Expatriate soccer players in the United States
FC Miami City players
FIU Panthers men's soccer players
French footballers
French expatriate footballers
French expatriate sportspeople in Norway
French expatriate sportspeople in the United States
Lake Erie Storm men's soccer players
Living people
Loudoun United FC players
United Premier Soccer League players
USL Championship players
USL League Two players